Rtishchevo is an air base in Russia located 6 km northwest of Rtishchevo.  It is a Let L-410UVP-E Turbolet training base.  Very few structures exist near the airfield.

The base is home to the 666th Training Aviation Regiment of the 786th Aviation Training Centre for the Training of Flight Personnel.

Michael Holm's data as of 2011 appears to suggest that Rtischchevo as of 1990 was home to the 666th Training Aviation Regiment of the Balashov Higher Military Aviation School for Pilots, subordinated to the Air Forces of the Volga-Ural Military District.

References

Soviet Air Force bases
Russian Air Force bases
Buildings and structures in Saratov Oblast